Kristine Ann Tan Bernal (born May 17, 1989) is a Filipino actress who became known for winning the fourth season of the reality-based talent search StarStruck of GMA Network. Bernal rose to fame as the other half in her loveteam with Aljur Abrenica. After the loveteam ended, the latter continued to topbill soap operas.

Early life and education
She was born as Kristine Ann Tan Bernal on May 17, 1989 in Quezon City, to Edgardo Bernal, an ethnic Tagalog and his Chinese wife, Analyn Tan. She has older twin sisters, Kathleen Ann and Katherine Ann and a younger brother named Miguel. She studied in Diliman Preparatory School and Holy Family School of Quezon City Inc. for her primary and secondary education. She took up nursing in Trinity University of Asia.

Career
Bernal joined StarStruck in 2006 and won as the Ultimate Love Team with Mart Escudero. Bernal became part of different GMA Network shows including Boys Nxt Door, Zaido: Pulis Pangkalawakan, and Dyesebel. Although she started in showbiz with Escudero as her partner, Bernal garnered more attention when she was paired with present love team partner Aljur Abrenica. Bernal and Abrenica starred in their first afternoon series Sine Novela: Dapat Ka Bang Mahalin? in 2009 and a primetime drama series All My Life in the same year. Bernal has also appeared in the movie Mag-ingat Ka Sa... Kulam with Judy Ann Santos and Dennis Trillo. In 2010, Bernal appeared in The Last Prince as one of the main characters along with co-stars Aljur Abrenica and Bianca King, Kris played Lara Fernandez, a hapless poor provincial girl enslaved by her cruel aunt and cousin, she is Almiro's true love and Bambi's older sister, she was also the rival of the very bad and vicious fairy Diwani Bawana (played by Bianca King). Lara's life became miserable because of Diwani and Mayang's cruelties. After she played Lara, Bernal was cast as the leading lady of a Philippine television drama, Koreana, where she played Jennifer "Jenny" Jung/Jenna Bartolome Jung (Hangul: 정제나; RR: Jeong Jena; MR: Chŏng Che-na), a very sensible and cheerful young woman. Aware of her Korean heritage, she acquaints herself with all things Korean, particularly their cuisine. And while in the midst of fulfilling her dream of becoming a chef, she unexpectedly ends up in a Korean restaurant, unwary that the place she works for is actually owned by Chang Hee Jung (played by Eddie Garcia) but she become opposed by Violeta Jung/Violeta Salcedo (played by Eula Valdez) and Ivy Jung.

2011–2016
Bernal got a main role in 2011 on the TV show Machete. Bernal played the role of Jessa Ledesma/Jessa Romero, Machete's close friend. Right after Machete, she played a lead role in Time of My Life, a TV show in which she played the mean character Zaira Marquez.

In 2012, she played a lead role in Hiram na Puso as Lira Banaag, a sweet and cheerful girl. A loving and obedient daughter of Zeny and Leo and Vanessa/Kara twin sister. Lira is raised with love and care by her mother, Zeny. Her fervent dream is to give her mother a comfortable life, that is why she strives hard to finish her studies. Unfortunately, she suffers from terrible heart condition and must undergoes heart transplant, an operation that will change, not only her old damage heart, but her whole life and the lives of the people around her, as well. At the end Lira dies from a hit & run accident. She was also opposed by Vanessa (played by Bela Padilla), a manipulative, ruthless and bitter woman who hates Lira as well.

The same year, Bernal played Andrea "Andy" Gomez in Coffee Prince, along with her love team Aljur Abrenica. Bernal played the lead role of the tomboyish girl who eventually falls in love with his boss, Arthur, who's unaware that she is actually a girl.

In 2013, she played another leading role in Prinsesa ng Buhay Ko, where she played Princess "Cess" Inocencio-Grande / Elizabeth Salazar a heroine who saved many people but become opposed by Kate Napoleon (played by LJ Reyes). After that she played Andrea "Andeng" Dizon again as the main character of Hiram na Alaala. She played the lead role of Tinay in Little Nanay who has an intellectual disability (ID).

In 2015 to 2016, she played various roles in Karelasyon, Dear Uge and Tadhana.

2017–2019
In 2017, Bernal played the role as Nimfa/Rosette in Impostora (based on the 2007 primetime drama series of the same title, originally portrayed by Sunshine Dizon. Kris Bernal played two roles, the main villain Rosette who is a purely evil mother and a murderess who will kill just to achieve her needs. The other one is the main character Nimfa, a tragic woman but later she was tasked to do an evil scheme. This is Kris Bernal's first villain and dual role.

In 2018, she leads the show, Asawa Ko, Karibal Ko as the kind-hearted, Rachel who is the love interest of Gavin. In 2019 after becoming the lead actress in a show, Kris Bernal was cast as the lead antagonist in a horror-thriller show, Hanggang sa Dulo ng Buhay Ko as the evil spirit of the story who will destroy a two couple. 

Bernal appeared on the cover of FHM Philippines May 2017 issue.

2020
During the COVID-19 pandemic in the Philippines, her GMA Network and GMA Artist Center contracts expired which made Bernal a freelancer with no manager.

She starred as Marikit Gonzales in her first drama series outside GMA Network titled, Ate ng Ate Ko, along with Isabelle de Leon, Jake Cuenca and Joem Bascon, which was produced by APT Entertainment and aired on TV5 through a blocktime agreement. 

Later in 2020, she temporarily joined Cornerstone Entertainment's roster of artists while remaining a freelance actress. However, in 2021, she transferred to ALV Talent Circuit.

Personal life
She was engaged to her long time boyfriend Perry Choi on February 6, 2020 and got married on September 25, 2021 at the Magallanes Church in Makati City. 

On March 3, 2023, Bernal announced on her official Instagram account that she and her husband are expecting a baby.

Filmography

Film

Television

Discography

References

External links
 

1989 births
People from Quezon City
Filipino people of Chinese descent
Actresses from Metro Manila
Living people
StarStruck (Philippine TV series) participants
Tagalog people
StarStruck (Philippine TV series) winners
GMA Network personalities
TV5 (Philippine TV network) personalities